Freetown Central Mosque is one of the two largest mosque in Sierra Leone. It is located in the capital Freetown. The chief imam of the Freetown central mosque is Sheikh Ahmad Tejan Sillah, who is also the spiritual leader of the United Council of Imams in Sierra Leone . The mosque also hosts various Islamic cultural events.

Sierra Leone's presidents have traditionally made occasional visit to the mosque and attend Muslim prayers, regardless of their religion. The immediate former  Sierra Leone's president Ernest Bai Koroma, who is a Christian, has visited and prayed at the central mosque on several occasions .

See also
 Islam in Sierra Leone

External links
http://www.thepatrioticvanguard.com/spip.php?article7388*-+
http://allafrica.com/stories/201109270329.html

Buildings and structures in Freetown
Mosques in Sierra Leone